

About 
Kristoff Krane is a rapper from Minneapolis, MN known for his stream-of-consciousness approach to writing, freestyling, and performing. In addition to his solo releases, Krane was also frontman alongside Eyedea (of Eyedea & Abilities) in Rhymesayers Entertainment's freestyle group, Face Candy. His newest project, Kairos, is a two-part album with music by Graham O'Brien released via indie record label, F I X.

"A journey through something both recklessly spontaneous but wholly balanced […] with its depth and thought-provoking messages strewn about with quick free writes and playful parables to bridge […] a must for the indie set and conscious hoppers".

- URB Magazine

"what might be the greatest treasure is the man’s impressive exhibition of flow, his various speeds and cadences, and voice stretching. Technically, he’s challenged his vocal abilities more so here than ever before, as his fluid and seamless yet excitingly articulated delivery is put to exquisite use, in a variety of modes.” 

- Swurv

"The whole project feels like it was created in a purgatorial state between our world & some higher dimension. Some of the purest art rap out there  
.”

- Amoeba Music

Discography

Studio albums
 This Will Work for Now (2008)
 Hunting for Father (2010)
 Picking Flowers Next to Roadkill (2010)
 Fanfaronade (2012)
 I Freestyle Life (2005-2013) (2014)
 Moon Goddess (2015) (as Kadoka)
 Kairos, Part 1 (2017)
 Kairos, Part 2 (2018)

Collaborative projects
Albums
 Abzorbr - Capable of Teetering (2005)
 Face Candy - This is Where We Were (2006, Rhymesayers Entertainment) 
 Face Candy - Waste Age Teenland (2011, Rhymesayers Entertainment)
 Prey for Paralysis - Prey for Paralysis (2011) with (Sadistik and Graham O'Brien)

EPs
 Abzorbr - EP1 (2005)
 Abzorbr - See-Through Eyes (2006) split w/ Carbon Carousel
 Abzorbr - EP2 (2007)
 Abzorbr - EP3 (2009)

Non-album singles
 F I X (2012) with F to I to X 
 Flash Flood (2014) with F to I to X 
 Firewalking (2014) with F to I to X 
 Out of Line (2015)

Guest appearances
 Sadistik - "Water" from Altars (2017) 
 Illogic & Blockhead - "Lighthouse" from Capture the Sun (2013)
 Mixed Blood Majority - "Ritual" from Mixed Blood Majority (2013)
 No Bird Sing - "Target Practice" from Definition Sickness (2012) 
 Graham O'Brien - "Recyclemaker" and "Query" from Live Drums (2010)
 No Bird Sing - “Sparrows" from No Bird Sing (2009)

References

External links 
 
 
Kristoff Krane on Bandcamp

1983 births
American male rappers
Living people
Rappers from Minnesota
Underground rappers